The Oscar Niemeyer Museum is located in the city of Curitiba, in the state of Paraná, in Brazil. It was inaugurated in 2002 with the name Novo Museu or New Museum. With the conclusion of remodeling and the construction of a new annex, it was reinaugurated on July 8, 2003, with the current denomination to honor its famous architect who completed this project at 95 years of age. It is also known as Museu do Olho or Niemeyer's Eye (Eye Museum or Niemeyer's Eye), due to the design of the building.

The museum focuses on the visual arts, architecture and design. For its magnificence, beauty and for the importance of the collection, it represents a cultural institution of international significance. The complex of two buildings, installed in an area of 35 thousand square meters (of which 19 thousand are dedicated to exhibition space), it is a true example of architecture allied with art. The first building was designed by Oscar Niemeyer in 1967, faithful to the style of the time, and conceived as an educational institute, which was opened in 1978.

The museum features many of Niemeyer's signature elements: bold geometric forms, sculptural curved volumes placed prominently to contrast with rectangular volumes, sinuous ramps for pedestrians, large areas of white painted concrete, and areas with vivid murals or paintings. Though rooted in modern architecture since his involvement in the international style, Niemeyer's designs have much in common with postmodern architecture as well and this is as contemporary a building as the artwork it displays.

Niemeyer's Eye

The distinctive annex to the Oscar Niemeyer Museum is reminiscent of a human eye and fundamentally gave the museum a new identity. The annex was completed and opened to the public in 2003, and the Novo Museu was renamed the Oscar Niemeyer Museum in the same year. Constructed of reinforced concrete, the idiosyncratic, 30-meter tall structure sits above a pool of water and is connected to the main museum building by a futuristic underground walkway. The annex contains a large spiral stairway among its levels, and the two diamond-shaped façades of the "eye" of the building are constructed of glass and steel and provide natural light to an exhibit space.

Grounds

The museum is located within a garden designed by the landscape architect Roberto Burle Marx, Niemeyer's previous collaborator on the design of Ibirapuera Park in Sao Paulo. The garden is further located within  of woodland.

Gallery

See also
List of Oscar Niemeyer works

References

External links

Oscar Niemeyer Museum official site
Oscar Niemeyer Museum in the Google Arts & Culture website

Buildings and structures completed in 2002
Art museums and galleries in Brazil
Museums in Curitiba
Oscar Niemeyer buildings
Art museums established in 2002
2002 establishments in Brazil